The fourbeard rockling or four-bearded rockling (Enchelyopus cimbrius) is a species of lotid fish found in the northern Atlantic Ocean. It is of minor importance in commercial fisheries.

Description
The fourbeard rockling is a long, slender fish named for its four barbels, one of which is on the chin and the others on the snout. The vent is halfway along the body and behind that, the body is laterally compressed. The anterior dorsal fin has one prominent long ray and is otherwise short and low. The posterior dorsal fin is very long and of even height. The anal fin is also long and the pelvic fins are in front of the pectorals. The caudal peduncle is very short and the caudal fin is rounded. The skin is slimy and the scales are not easy to see. The dorsal surface is generally brownish with sometimes some irregular darker blotches at the posterior end. The flanks and belly are silvery grey. The fins are a bluish colour with darker trailing edges to the dorsal, anal and caudal fins.

Distribution and habitat
The fourbeard rockling is found in the northwestern Atlantic Ocean from northern Gulf of Mexico to Newfoundland and western Greenland, and in the northeastern Atlantic Ocean from the Bay of Biscay to Iceland and the Barents Sea, the western Baltic Sea and occasionally in the Gulf of Finland. It has become a near-threatened species in the Baltic.

It migrates offshore in spring and inshore in autumn.

Biology
The fourbeard rockling is a bottom-dwelling fish which feeds on crustaceans, polychaete worms, molluscs and other invertebrates.  It usually breeds between February and August, releasing the spawn in deep water after which the eggs float towards the surface.

References

fourbeard rockling
Fish of the North Atlantic
Taxa named by Carl Linnaeus
fourbeard rockling